Remy Beasley is a Welsh actress best known for playing Beyoncé Evans in the Sky1 TV comedy drama series Stella. She comes from Chepstow, where her mother Alison ran a pub.

Filmography

Television

References

External links
 

Living people
Year of birth missing (living people)
Welsh television actresses
People from Chepstow
Alumni of the Royal Welsh College of Music & Drama